Beelia is a genus of fungi in the family Elsinoaceae.

The genus name of Beelia is in honour of Maurice Philippe Gaspard Beeli (1879-1957), a Belgian botanist from Meise.

References

Myriangiales